Ines Abassi (born 1982) is a Tunisian poet and journalist. She has published two volumes of poetry to date, both of which have received regional literary awards. She also spent a six-month residency in Seoul and wrote Tales of the Korean Scheherezade out of that experience. Her work has been published in numerous outlets including the literary magazine Banipal, where her work was included in an issue devoted to Modern Tunisian Literature.

Abassi currently works as a journalist in the UAE.

Works
 Secrets of the Wind (2004), collection of poetry, winner of the Tunisian Poetry Prize
 Archive of Blind (2007), collection of poetry, winner of the CREDIF prize, Tunis
 Tales of the Korean Scheherezade (2010)

References

External links
 Profile on Emirates Airline Festival of Literature 2011 website
 Profile on Arab Women Writers website 

Living people
1982 births
20th-century Tunisian women
21st-century Tunisian women writers
21st-century Tunisian writers